Lansdowne Football Club, also sometimes referred to as Lansdowne Rugby Football Club, is a rugby union team based in Dublin, Ireland. It was founded in 1872 by Henry Dunlop as the Irish Champion Athletic Club. Its senior team currently plays in Division 1A of the All-Ireland League. The club's playing colours are black, red and yellow hoops, with navy shorts.

Lansdowne have won the Leinster Senior Cup a record 28 times, winning it for the first in 1891. Lansdowne won the All Ireland League for the first time in March 2013 and also won the Fraser McMullen cup in the same season. Lansdowne completed the "All Ireland Double" again in May 2015 winning the All Ireland League and the Fraser McMullen again. In 2017/2018 captained by Ian Prendiville & coached by Mike Ruddock & Mark McHugh Lansdowne won the All Ireland League, The Bateman Cup, The Leinster Senior Cup and The Leinster Senior League Cup. Lansdowne is the first ever Leinster team to win all of these trophies in one season.

Together with Wanderers, Lansdowne have shared the use of Lansdowne Road since 1880, with each club having their own clubhouse at opposite ends of the ground. However, since 1974 the ground itself has been owned by the IRFU.

Honours

All-Ireland League: 3
2012-13, 2014–15, 2017–18
All-Ireland Cup: 7
1921-22, 1928–29, 1929–30, 1930–31, 2017–18, 2019-20 (Joint winners), 2021-22
 Leinster Senior League 11
1973-74, 1976–77, 1980–81, 1985–86, 1986–87, 1987–88, 1997–98, 2001–02, 2017–18, 2018–19, 2021–22
Leinster Senior Cup 28
1890-91, 1900–01, 1902–03, 1903–04, 1921–22, 1926–27, 1927–28, 1928–29, 1929–30, 1930–31, 1932–33, 1948–49, 1949–50, 1952–53, 1964–65, 1971–72, 1978–79, 1979–80, 1980–81, 1985–86, 1988–89, 1990–91, 1996–97, 1997–98, 2007–08, 2016–17, 2017–18, 2018-19
Metropolitan Cup (16)
1927, 1948, 1959, 1965, 1968, 1981, 1982, 1983, 1989, 2000, 2003, 2007, 2009, 2010, 2017, 2019
Fraser McMullen Cup
2012-13, 2014–15

Notable players

Current Leinster / Connacht / Munster -contracted players

Ireland sevens international players
The following Lansdowne players have played for the Ireland national rugby sevens team:
Ian Fitzpatrick
Foster Horan
Adam Leavy
Fiachra Baynes
John O'Donnell
Cian Aherne
Tom Daly
Mark Roche
Peter Sullivan
Aidan McCullen
Eric Elwood
Brian Glennon
Vinnie Becker

 
Rugby clubs established in 1872
Irish rugby union teams
Rugby union clubs in Dublin (city)
Senior Irish rugby clubs (Leinster)